This was the first edition of the tournament.

Ariel Behar and Andrey Golubev won the title after defeating Hugo Gaston and Tristan Lamasine 6–4, 6–2 in the final.

Seeds

Draw

References

External links
 Main draw

Internazionali di Tennis Città di Trieste - Doubles